Barney Boko was a British comic strip series, drawn by John R. Mason, which was published in the British comics magazine The Dandy from 1937 to 1944. It was about a tramp whose incredibly long nose could be used for anything, from a Christmas tree to a bridge. It ran for seven years from the first issue in December 1937.

References

 (source Dandy and Beano: An Alphabet of Fun, published 1996)
 https://comicvine.gamespot.com/barney-boko/4005-84907/

1937 comics debuts
Comics characters introduced in 1937
Boko, Barney
Boko, Barney
Humor comics
DC Thomson Comics strips
British comic strips
Boko, Barney
1944 comics endings
Dandy strips
Boko, Barney